The Louisiana–Monroe Warhawks baseball (formerly the Northeast Louisiana Indians) team represents the University of Louisiana at Monroe in NCAA Division I college baseball. The Warhawks baseball team competes in the Sun Belt Conference. The Warhawks play their home games on campus at Warhawk Field, and are currently coached by Michael Federico.

History

Head coaches
The Warhawks have had 12 head coaches in the history of their baseball program:

Notes: Brad Holland was fired after an 0–13 start in 2006 and was replaced by Jeff Schexnaider. Schexnaider was fired after an 8–17 start in 2014 and was replaced by Bruce Peddie.

Conference membership history
1952–1953: Independent
1954–1971:  Gulf States Conference
1972–1978:  Independent
1979–1982:  Atlantic Sun Conference
1983–2006:  Southland Conference
2007–Present:  Sun Belt Conference

Regular Season Championships

Conference Tournament Championships

Year-by-year results

NCAA Regional appearances
· ULM has a record of 3–9 in regional appearances.

Major League Baseball
Louisiana–Monroe has had 65 Major League Baseball Draft selections since the draft began in 1965, five of whom have reached the major leagues.

Retired Players
· #8 – Tom Brown
· #15 – Ben Sheets
· #24 – Lou St. Amant
· #31 – Chuck Finley

Warhawk Field

Attendance
ULM has ranked in the Top 50 in average attendance in the nation four times since 1999.

Attendance Records
Below is a list of ULM's top five single-game attendance figures.

See also
List of NCAA Division I baseball programs

References

External links
 

 
Baseball teams established in 1952